The 1955 Irish local elections were held in all the counties, cities and towns of the Republic of Ireland in 1955 under the Local Government Act, 1955.

Results

References 

Local
Council elections in the Republic of Ireland